Sewwandi (The Rose) is a 2006 Sri Lankan Sinhala war drama film directed by Vasantha Obeysekera and co-produced by Sunil T. Fernando for Sunil T. Films with Sangeetha Weeraratne. It stars Sangeetha Weeraratne herself with Kamal Addararachchi in lead roles along with Ravindra Randeniya and Chandani Seneviratne. Music composed by Rohana Weerasinghe. Along with the Sinhala copy, two more Tamil copies were released in two theatres as well. It is the 1080th Sri Lankan film in the Sinhala cinema.

Plot

Cast
 Sangeetha Weeraratne as Kumari
 Kamal Addararachchi as Pradeep
 Ravindra Randeniya as Priyantha
 Chandani Seneviratne as Lalitha
 Dilhani Ekanayake as Shirani
 Dayan Witharana as Mahinda
 D.B. Gangodathenna
 Muthu Tharanga
 Kumara Thirimadura
 Dayadeva Edirisinghe

References

2006 films
2000s Sinhala-language films